The Clyde oil field is a crude oil producing field in the UK sector of the North Sea, 290 km east-south-east of Aberdeen. Production of oil started in 1987 and the field is still operational (2021).

The field 
The Clyde oil field is located in Block 30/17b of the UK North Sea continental shelf. It is named after the Scottish river. The reservoir and its fluids has the following characteristics:

Owners and operators 
The initial owners of the field were Britoil (51%), Shell UK Ltd (24.5%) and Esso Petroleum Company Ltd (24.5%). Britoil was the operator. BP assumed ownership of Britoil assets in 1988. BP sold its interest in Clyde to Talisman in 1996. The company became Talisman Sinopec Energy, then Repsol Sinopec.

Development 
The Clyde field was developed by a single integrated drilling, production and accommodation platform. The principal design data of the Clyde platform is given in the following table.

Processing 
Oil from the wellheads and subsea tie-ins is routed to the 1st stage 3-phase (oil, gas, water) separator. Oil then flows to the 2nd stage and 3rd stage separators operating at successively lower pressures. After metering the oil is pumped to the Fulmar A platform for storage and tanker loading.

Produced water from the separators is treated in a degassing vessel and hydrocyclones to an oil-in-water concentration of less than 30 ppm prior to discharge overboard.

Gas from the separators is compressed in the LP Compressor, Intermediate Pressure (IP) Compressor, HP Compressor and Export/Lift Compressor. There is also a gas dehydration plant. Gas in excess of that required for gas lift is exported to Fulmar A and then to the SEGAL system to St. Fergus terminal.

The fluid handling capability of the Clyde facilities in its latter years was as follows:

Other fields 
Several subsea fields are connected to Clyde through flowlines and pipelines. These fields include Leven, Medwin, Nethan, Orion, Cawdor and Flyndre. There are dedicated Separators on Clyde for the Orion and Flyndre fields. Data on these fields are as follows:

The Flyndre field is located in the Norwegian sector of the North Sea. Production began in March 2017.

References 

North Sea oil fields
Oil fields of Scotland
Oil fields of the United Kingdom